Saros Bay or Gulf of Saros is a gulf in the Dardanelles, Turkey. Ancient Greeks called it the Gulf of Melas, before it was renamed.

Far from industrialized areas and thanks to underwater currents, it is a popular summer recreation resort with sandy strands and crystal-clear sea. Scuba diving, windsurfing and fishing are the most practiced water sports here.

Settlements around the bay are: Gökçetepe, Mecidiye, Erikli, Danişment, Yayla, Karaincirli, Vakıf, Büyükevren, Sultaniçe, Gülçavuş and Enez, all in Edirne Province. The islands of Gökçeada (Imbros) lie outside Saros Bay and Samothrace in the Aegean Sea, Greece, is in short distance.

The North Anatolian Fault Zone, the most prominent active fault in Turkey and the source of numerous large earthquakes throughout history, passes through the Gulf of İzmit and traverses the Marmara Sea reaching to the Saros Bay to the southeast.

On the Southern shore of the Dardanelles, across from Gallipoli, was the location of legendary Troy.

Non-combat military incident 

The bay served for a long time as a place for NATO's amphibious exercises. In the fall of 1992, the Turkish destroyer Muavenet was hit by two Sea Sparrow missiles fired by the U.S. aircraft carrier  during the NATO exercise "Display Determination" held in the bay. The incident cost the lives of several Turkish officers, while many others aboard were injured seriously.

See also 

 Battle of Gallipoli
 Botaş Saros FSRU Terminal, under construction as of 2022

References 

Geography of Thrace
Saros
Saros
Landforms of Çanakkale Province
Thracian Sea
Important Bird Areas of Turkey